Elliot Wallis (born 10 May 2000) is an English professional rugby league footballer who plays on the  for Midlands Hurricanes in RFL League 1, on DR loan from Castleford Tigers in the Betfred Super League.

He has previously spent time on loan from Hull KR at the York City Knights in the Championship.

Background
Wallis was born in Kingston upon Hull, East Riding of Yorkshire, England, and is of Nigerian heritage.

Playing career

Early career
Wallis is a former Skirlaugh Bulls' amateur, Elliot is a product of and another player to blossom through the ranks of the City of Hull Academy, before he started spending more time with the Hull Kingston Rovers' first-team squad.

Senior career

Hull Kingston Rovers (2018 - present)
Wallis made his Hull Kingston Rovers' first-team début against the Wigan Warriors, in a 10-28 defeat in the Challenge Cup competition on 13 May 2018, the match was played at Hull Kingston Rovers' home ground of Craven Park.

Wallis' first Super League appearance against the same opposition came a few weeks later on 25 May 2018, when Hull Kingston Rovers beat the Wigan Warriors by a score of 24-8.

Wallis scored his first tries for Hull Kingston Rovers against the Warrington Wolves on 20 July 2018, in a 20-34 defeat in the Super League competition.

On 11 November 2020 Wallis signed a one-year loan deal with the Bradford Bulls for the 2021 season.

References

External links
Hull KR profile
SL profile

2000 births
Living people
Bradford Bulls players
Castleford Tigers players
Coventry Bears players
English rugby league players
Hull Kingston Rovers players
Rugby league players from Kingston upon Hull
Rugby league wingers
York City Knights players